Perloff is a surname. Notable people with the surname include:

Carey Perloff (born 1959), American theatre director and playwright
Marjorie Perloff (born 1931), American literary critic
Richard M. Perloff, American academic
Robert Perloff (1921–2013), American psychologist
Andrew Perloff, English, Real Estate.
Jeffrey M. Perloff, American economist